José Raúl Baena Urdiales (born 2 March 1989) is a Spanish professional footballer who plays as a defensive midfielder for CE Sabadell FC.

Club career

Espanyol
Born in Torrox, Province of Málaga, Andalusia, and after starting his footballing career at local Málaga CF and later coming through the FC Barcelona's youth ranks, Baena switched to Catalonia neighbours RCD Espanyol in 2007, at the age of 18. He made his debut with its first team on 4 October 2009 in a La Liga match against Villarreal CF, playing the second half as the ten-man side eventually held off the hosts to a 0–0 draw.

Baena quickly became an integral part of the main squad, alternating starts with appearances from the bench in his debut season. On 12 December 2009, his penalty offense on FC Barcelona's Xavi supposed the game's only goal, in a derby defeat.

Baena was regularly used by manager Mauricio Pochettino in the following campaigns, often partnering another club youth graduate, Javi Márquez, in central midfield. On 21 January 2012 he scored his first goal in the top flight, opening the score in a 3–0 home victory over Granada CF.

Rayo Vallecano
On 26 June 2013, Baena signed a two-year contract with Rayo Vallecano. In 2014–15 he scored twice in 28 matches to help his team to finish 11th in the top tier and, at its closure, agreed to a two-year extension.

Granada
Baena joined Granada of the Segunda División in the summer of 2017, agreeing to a three-year deal. During his only season at the Nuevo Estadio de Los Cármenes, he acted as team captain. 

In September 2018, Baena signed for Melbourne Victory FC on a one-year loan. He scored his only goal in the A-League on 1 December in a 4–0 home defeat of Western Sydney Wanderers FC, and left the following May.

Kitchee
Baena joined Hong Kong Premier League club Kitchee SC on 10 December 2020, after one year with Atromitos F.C. in the Super League Greece. On 1 May 2022, in the last group fixture of the AFC Champions League, he scored in injury time of the 2–2 home draw with Vissel Kobe, sending his team through to the knockout stage at the expense of Melbourne City FC.

Later career
In February 2023, aged 34, Baena returned to Spain after five years away, with CE Sabadell FC of the Primera Federación.

International career
Baena won his only cap for the Spain under-21 side on 28 March 2011 as a member of Espanyol, coming on as a 70th-minute substitute for Athletic Bilbao's Ander Herrera in the 1–1 friendly draw with Belarus held in Alcalá de Henares.

Career statistics

Notes

References

External links

1989 births
Living people
Sportspeople from the Province of Málaga
Spanish footballers
Footballers from Andalusia
Association football midfielders
La Liga players
Segunda División players
Segunda División B players
Tercera División players
Primera Federación players
RCD Espanyol B footballers
RCD Espanyol footballers
Rayo Vallecano players
Granada CF footballers
CE Sabadell FC footballers
A-League Men players
Melbourne Victory FC players
Super League Greece players
Atromitos F.C. players
Hong Kong Premier League players
Kitchee SC players
Spain youth international footballers
Spain under-21 international footballers
Spanish expatriate footballers
Expatriate soccer players in Australia
Expatriate footballers in Greece
Expatriate footballers in Hong Kong
Spanish expatriate sportspeople in Australia
Spanish expatriate sportspeople in Greece
Spanish expatriate sportspeople in Hong Kong